Werner Tübke (30 July 1929 in Schönebeck, Germany – 27 May 2004 in Leipzig, Germany) was a German painter, best known for his monumental Peasants' War Panorama located in Bad Frankenhausen. Associated with the Leipzig School, he is "one of the few East German artists who gained recognition in West Germany."

Early Bourgeois Revolution in Germany

It depicts a scene from the German Peasants' War, which took place from 1524 to 1525.

References

1929 births
2004 deaths
People from Schönebeck
People from the Province of Saxony
Recipients of the National Prize of East Germany
German contemporary artists
East German artists
Academic staff of the Hochschule für Grafik und Buchkunst Leipzig
Artists from Leipzig